Karymsky District  is an administrative and municipal district (raion), one of the thirty-one in Zabaykalsky Krai, Russia. It is located in the center of the krai and borders Tungokochensky District in the north, Shilkinsky District in the east, Aginsky District in the south, and Chitinsky District in the west. Its administrative center is the urban locality (an urban-type settlement) of Karymskoye. As of the 2010 Census, the total population of the district was 37,161, with the population of Karymskoye accounting for 35.1% of that number.

History
The district was established on January 4, 1926. It is named after the ethnic group of Karyms.

References

Notes

Sources

Districts of Zabaykalsky Krai
States and territories established in 1926
